Stour may refer to:

 River Stour (disambiguation), several rivers
 HMS Stour, a Royal Navy River-class destroyer purchased in 1909
 Stour-class destroyer, the sub-class of Royal Navy destroyers of which HMS Stour was the lead ship 
 Stour (narrowboat), a canalboat at the Black Country Living Museum, England

See also

 East Stour (disambiguation)
 Papa Stour
 Stour Brook
 Stour Row
 Stour Valley (disambiguation)
 West Stour (disambiguation)